Holochlora japonica, the Japanese broadwinged katydid, is a species of katydid or bush cricket native to eastern Asia in the large subfamily Phaneropterinae. 

The Japanese broadwinged katydid was first described in 1878 by Swiss entomologist Carl Brunner von Wattenwyl in his Monographie der Phaneropteriden. The type locality is in Japan.

Description
The ovipositor of females is darkened at the tip, with black, serrated lines on the sides.

References

japonica
Orthoptera of Asia
Insects described in 1878